Almost Monday (stylized as almost monday) are an American indie pop trio based in San Diego, California. Their debut EP, Don't Say You're Ordinary, was released on October 9, 2020.

History
Dawson Daugherty, Cole Clisby, and Luke Fabry met while in high school in San Diego's North County area. Fabry and Daugherty grew up together and were longtime friends, and Daugherty met Clisby through surfing. Daughtery and Fabry attended Point Loma Nazarene University, and Clisby went to the University of California, San Diego. They initially wanted to call their band The Mondays, but the name was taken, so they went with Almost Monday.

Their first single, "Broken People", was released on April 22, 2019. It reached number 27 on the Billboard Alternative Airplay charts. On May 29, 2020, the band released the single "Come On Come On". Their debut EP, Don't Say You're Ordinary, was recorded in San Diego, Los Angeles, and Brooklyn, and released on Hollywood Records on October 9, 2020. The EP was produced by Mark Needham and Simon Oscroft, and mixed by Mark Needham. On January 26, 2021, they released the single "Live Forever". On April 8, 2022, they released the single "Sunburn" and on June 3, 2022, they released the single "Sun Keeps on Shining." In 2022, they toured with Joywave and The Driver Era. They released the single "Cough Drops" on October 5, 2022. On February 24, 2023, they released the single "Only Wanna Dance" after finishing their North American tour.

Members
 Dawson Daugherty (vocals)
 Cole Clisby (guitar)
 Luke Fabry (bass)

Discography

EP

Singles

References 

Musical groups established in 2015
American musical trios
Indie pop groups from California
Musicians from San Diego
Hollywood Records artists
2015 establishments in California